Casino is the third studio album by Blue Rodeo. It was drummer Mark French's only album with the band. It was produced by Dwight Yoakam guitarist Pete Anderson.

"Trust Yourself," "After the Rain," and, most significantly, "Til I Am Myself Again" were notable hit singles from the album. The album was the ninth-best selling Cancon album in Canada of 1990, despite only being available for the last month of the year.

Track listing
All songs by Greg Keelor and Jim Cuddy.

"Til I Am Myself Again"  – 3:58
"What Am I Doing Here"  – 3:08
"5 A.M. (A Love Song)"  – 3:59
"Montreal"  – 3:15
"Last Laugh"  – 4:01
"Trust Yourself"  – 3:49
"Two Tongues"  – 4:22
"Time"  – 3:36
"After the Rain"  – 4:22
"You're Everywhere"  – 2:49

Casino Demos
In 2012, as part of Blue Rodeo's 25th anniversary box set, Blue Rodeo: 1987 - 1993, a disc of demos from this album was released, including two previously unreleased songs.

"If I Had A Heart" — previously unreleased demo
"Always Have A Place For You" — previously unreleased demo
"Til I Am Myself Again"
"What Am I Doing Here"
"5 A.M. (A Love Song)"
"Montreal"
"Last Laugh"
"Trust Yourself"
"Two Tongues"
"Time"
"After the Rain"
"Photograph" — later released on Five Days in July
"Is It You" — later released on Lost Together

Personnel 
 Jim Cuddy – Guitar, Vocals
 Basil Donovan – Bass
 Mark French – Drums
 Greg Keelor – Guitar, Vocals
 Bob Wiseman – Organ, Harmonica, Piano, Accordion

Additional musicians/personnel
 Pete Anderson – Guitar, Mandolin, Producer
 Lenny Castro – Percussion
 Judy Clapp – Engineer
 Peter Doell – Engineer
 Jeff Donavan – Drums
 Skip Edwards – Organ
 Taras Prodaniuk – Bass

Chart performance

Certifications

References

1990 albums
Blue Rodeo albums
Albums produced by Pete Anderson